The Bienal de Flamenco is celebrated in Seville, Spain, in different theatres of the city. This festival features dancers, vocalists, and guitarists in a display ranging from flamenco puro to innovative new works.

The festival was first celebrated in 1980, with Jose Luis Ortiz Nuevo as the director and with a poster designed by Joaquín Sáenz. The Giraldillo (the festival award) was won by Calixto Sanchez.

References

External links
Official site of Bienal de Flamenco
Canal Sur Television, the official TV site of Bienal de Flamenco

 
Spanish music
Andalusian music
Spanish folk music
Spanish dances